Wolf Ruvinskis (October 31, 1921 – November 9, 1999), born Wolf Ruvinskis Manevics, was a Latvian-Mexican actor and professional wrestler. He was married to dancer Armida Herrera. Born to a Latvian mother and a Ukrainian father, of Jewish background, they relocated to Argentina in 1923. In spite of living in extreme poverty he excelled in sports and as a professional wrestler he toured South America, the United States and Mexico. This last country became his place of residence where he stayed in the ring well into the 1960s, wrestling El Santo, Black Shadow, El Médico Asesino and Lobo Negro. As a wrestler he was introduced to the Cinema of Mexico playing luchadores, in particular a masked character he created called Neutrón. He also belongs to the Golden Age of Mexican cinema.

Biography
Born on October 31, 1921, in Liepaja, Latvia.  His parents emigrated to Argentina in 1923. The Ruvinskis family lived in poverty in Argentina, forcing a very young Wolf Ruvinskis to begin wrestling professionally as a way to help provide for his family.

Professional wrestling career

Ruvinskis quickly became a proficient Rudo (bad guy) in wrestling, which led him to be booked on tours of South America and later on both Mexico and the United States. When he came to Mexico he was originally slated for a short tour of the country before moving on, but he fell in love with the country and settled there soon after. He also met and married a Mexican woman and started a family. In the ring he played a savage, vicious Rudo character which was very successful and manage to draw large crowds wherever he went as everyone wanted the local top tecnico ("good guy") to defeat the savage El Lobo Letonia ("The Latvian Wolf"). His promising wrestling career was cut short around 1950 when accumulated injuries forced him to stop wrestling.

Acting career

After his retirement Ruvinskis focused on his second passion, acting. He had already played smaller parts in movies before retirement but after he retired he went into the acting business full-time. One of his most memorable roles was in the movie La bestia magnífica ("The Magnificent Beast") from 1953. With his background in wrestling it was only a matter of time before he became involved in the Mexican Lucha film genre. He played the lead role in the 1956 cult classic El Ladron de Cadaveres, which is now considered the first true Mexican Wrestling/ Horror film. Ruviniskis also played the part of a masked wrestling character/ superhero called Neutrón in a series of movies between 1960 and 1964. His acting career ended in 1996 (at age 74) with the movie La mujer de los dos ("The Woman for the Two"). In recent years Lucha movies have been shown regularly on Mexican television leading to a bit of a revival of Wolf Ruvinskis' memory, reminding fans that Ruviniski was both a great wrestler and a great actor. For some reason, he is credited variously in reference books and in film credits as "Wolf Ruvinskis", "Wolf Ruvinski", "Wolf Rubinski" or "Wolf Rubinskis".

Late life
After he stopped acting Ruvinskis opened a restaurant and became a very hands-on, passionate restaurateur who oversaw a couple of Argentinian restaurants in Mexico City named "El Rincón Gaucho". While he played a hated villain in wrestling his real persona was a complete opposite, described as a gentleman who lived to entertain diners with conversation and jokes, or at times even an Argentinian Tango. Wolf Ruviniskis died on November 9, 1999 in Mexico City. He was 78.

Acting Awards
 Ariel Award by the Mexican Academy of Film
Best supporting actor for Juego limpio (1996)

Filmography

As a producer
La última lucha (1959)

As an actor
La mujer de los dos (1996)
Juego limpio (1996)
Un Ángel para los Diablillos (1993)
Días de combate (1987)
Rosa de dos aromas (1989)
La Mafia tiembla (1987)
The Kidnapping of Lola (1986)
La fuga de Carrasco (1983)
Nocaut (1983) – as don Saúl
El Patrullero 777 (1977)
El Mexicano (1976) – as lieutenant José Alvarado
El Hombre del puente (1975) – as the military dictator
Acapulco 12-22 (1971) – as Claude, yacht captain
El crepúsculo de un dios (1968) – as Charles González
Esclava del deseo (1967) – as Bronco
Santo, el Enmascarado de Plata vs. los villanos del ring / Santo vs the Villains of the Ring (1966) – as Rodolfo Labra
Santo, el Enmascarado de Plata vs. la invasión de los marcianos / Santo vs the Martian Invasion (1966) – as Argos
Cargamento prohibido (1965) – as Carlos Aguilar
El señor doctor (1965) – as Beto's father
Jinetes de la llanura (1964) – as Andrés Menchaca
Neutrón Movie series as Neutrón
Neutrón contra los asesinos del karate / Neutron vs the Karate Killers (1965)
Neutrón contra el criminal sádico / Neutron vs the Maniac (1964)
Neutrón contra el doctor Caronte / Neutron vs the Amazing Dr. Caronte (1960)
Los autómatas de la muerte / Neutron vs the Death Robots (1960)
Neutrón el Enmascarado Negro / Neutron, the Man in the Black Mask (1960)
El Rapto de las Sabinas (1960) – as Rómulo
Las canciones unidas (1960) – as soviet delegate
Vivo o muerto (1959) – as Crisanto Medina
La estrella vacía (1958) – as Tomás Téllez
La última lucha / The Last Fight (1958) – as Lobo
Los Tigres del Ring series / Tigers of the Ring (1957) – as Mario or Rafael
El torneo de la muerte
Furias desatadas
Secuestro diabólico
Los tigres del ring 
El superflaco (1957) – as Rudy
Paso a la juventud (1957) – as Rodolfo
A media luz los tres (1957) – as Sebastián Reyes
Ladrón de cadáveres / The Body Snatcher (1956) – as Guillermo Santana (one of the earliest Mexican / Wrestling horror films)
Los tres mosqueteros... y medio (1956) – as Aramís
 Puss Without Boots (1957) – as Humberto Carrasco
El medallón del crimen (El 13 de oro) (1955) – as Ramón Torres
El túnel seis (1955) – as Ricardo Álvarez
Los Gavilanes (1954) – as Rómulo
 Barefoot Sultan (1954) – as Hilario Trujeque
La vida no vale nada (1954) – as El Caimán
La gitana blanca (1954) – as Yaco
¿Por qué ya no me quieres? (1953) – as the gangster
A Tailored Gentleman (1953) – as Chucho
Reportaje (1953) – as policeman
La sexta carrera (1953) – as horseracer
 The Vagabond (1953) – as Hércules
Pepe el Toro (1952) – as Bobby Galeana
El plebeyo (1952) – as Lobo
 You've Got Me By the Wing (1953) – as Mayordomo
 The Photographer (1953) – as Esbirro principal
Cuando levanta la niebla (1952) – as sick man
Las tres alegres comadres (1952) – as Tranquilino
 The Beautiful Dreamer (1952) / The Sleeping Beauty (1952) – as Tracatá/doctor Heinrich Wolf
La bestia magnífica / The Magnificent Beast (1952) – as Carlos (one of the earliest Mexican wrestling films)
Los tres alegres compadres (1951) – as Diana's lover
Las locuras de Tin Tan (1951) – as crazy strong guy
La noche avanza (1951) – as Bodoques
 Women Without Tomorrow (1951) – as Juan
El revoltoso (1951) – as Roberto
Trotacalles (1951) – as Carlos
Camino del infierno (1950) – as Tony
Sinbad the Seasick (1950) – as Mary's boyfriend
El hombre sin rostro (1950) – as monstruo
Amor salvaje (1949) – as marinero
La oveja negra (1949) – as the boxer El Campeón Asesino
Hipócrita (film) (1949) – as El Rayas
No me defiendas, compadre (1949) – as the wrestler El Enmascarado

Television roles
I Spy (March 4, 1968, episode #321 Shana) as Andreyev

References

External links
 Wolf Ruvinskis at the Cinema of Mexico site of the ITESM
 
 Neutrón profile at International Hero

Argentine emigrants to Mexico
Argentine Jews
Argentine people of Latvian-Jewish descent
Latvian emigrants to Argentina
Latvian World War II refugees
Latvian emigrants to Mexico
Latvian Jews
Mexican male film actors
Mexican male professional wrestlers
Mexican Jews
Mexican people of Latvian-Jewish descent
Naturalized citizens of Mexico
Sportspeople from Riga
Professional wrestlers from Mexico City
1921 births
1999 deaths
20th-century Mexican male actors
Russian male professional wrestlers